The Explorer's Grand Slam is an adventurer goal to reach the North Pole and South Pole, as well as climb the Seven Summits (Everest, Aconcagua, Denali, Kilimanjaro, Elbrus, Vinson, and Puncak Jaya or Kosciuszko). Purists also include a submarine expedition to the bottom of the Mariana Trench, but this is not necessary by most popular accounts.

History 
The original concept involved the polar trips starting from accepted coastal points, involving long sledging journeys. Over time the significantly shorter, easier, and less serious "Last Degree" polar trips – from 89 degrees to the pole (at 90 degrees) – have been claimed as the Explorer's Grand Slam (Last Degree). Currently, the climbing community and other leading organizations including the American Alpine Club, The Explorers Club, climbing companies such as International Mountain Guides, and the popular press all define the Explorer's Grand Slam as having accomplished the Seven Summits plus (at a minimum – the last degree of) the North and South Poles. There is some consensus that a True Explorer's Grand Slam means one will also have summitted all 14 peaks above 8,000 metres (26,247 ft) (14 + 7 + 2). Likewise, there is some consensus that a True Adventurer's Grand Slam is achieved by also visiting the magnetic north and south poles. As of 2022, all terminology and guidelines regarding polar data records are being conducted under the Polar Expeditions Classification Scheme (PECS).

In 1998, David Hempleman-Adams became the first person to complete an Explorer's Grand Slam.

In April 2005, Park Young-seok became the first person to complete a True Explorer's Grand Slam.

In 2011, former Wales rugby union international Richard Parks became the first person ever to complete the (Last Degree) Grand Slam within a single calendar year, doing so within seven months.

On April 16, 2013, Vanessa O'Brien became the first woman to complete the (Last Degree) Grand Slam under a single calendar year, doing so in eleven months.

On April 22, 2013, Cheryl Bart became the first Australian woman and the 31st person worldwide to complete the Explorer's Grand Slam.

In 2014, Jing Wang became the fastest woman to complete the (Last Degree) Grand Slam in 142 days.

In 2014, Ryan Waters became the first American to complete the True Adventurer's Grand Slam by skiing full-length, unsupported and unassisted North and South Pole expeditions and climbing the seven summits.

On April 21, 2015, Tashi Malik and Nungshi Malik became world's first twins and siblings as well as the first South Asians to complete the Explorer's Grand Slam (Last Degree).

On May 27, 2016, Colin O'Brady became the fastest person to complete the Explorer's Grand Slam (Last Degree), doing so in 139 days. He is the current world speed record holder for completing the Explorer's Grand Slam (Last Degree).

On April 12, 2017, Marin Minamiya became the youngest person to complete the Explorer's Grand Slam (Last Degree) at 20 years old.

People who completed the quest

Full Grand Slam (both poles from an outer coastline/shore) 

In chronological order:

  David Hempleman-Adams
  Erling Kagge
  Fyodor Konyukhov
  Heo Young-ho
  Park Young-seok (first person to complete a True Explorers Grand Slam)
  Bernard Voyer
  Cecilie Skog
  Maxime Chaya
  Ryan Waters
  Stuart Smith
  Johan Ernst Nilson
  Wilco van Rooijen

Grand Slam (one pole from an inner coastline/shore and one pole from an outer coastline/shore or last degree) 

In chronological order:

  Haraldur Ólafsson (SP non-Coastal)
  Khoo Swee Chiow (SP non-Coastal)
  Alison Levine (NP non-Coastal)
  Mostafa Salameh (NP non-Coastal)
  Newall Hunter (NP non-Coastal)
  Zhang Liang (SP non-Coastal)
   Grazyna Machnik  (NP non-Coastal)
  Jaco Ottink (NP non-Coastal)
  Jérôme Brisebourg (NP non-Coastal)
  Mark Shuttleworth (NP non-Coastal)

Last Degree Grand Slam (both poles from 89 degrees) 

In chronological order:

  Sean Disney
  Vaughan de la Harpe
  Sibusiso Vilane
  Arthur Marsden
  Andrew Van Der Velde
  Vernon Tejas
  Will Cross
   Lei Wang
  Neil Laughton
  Jo Gambi
  Rob Gambi
  Randall Peeters
  Wang Yongfeng
  Ci Luo
  Liu Jian
  Wang Shi
  Zhong Jianmin
  Jin Feibao
  Wang Qiuyang
  Suzanne K Nance
  Richard Parks
  Andrea Cardona
  John Dahlem
  Matthew Holt
   Arnold Witzig
  Len Stanmore
  Cheryl Bart
   Vanessa O'Brien
  Sebastian Merriman
  Jing Wang
  Tashi Malik
  Nungshi Malik
  Omar Samra
   Maria (Masha) Gordon
  Colin O'Brady
  John Moorhouse
  Victor Vescovo
  Sean Swarner
  Marin Minamiya
  Michael W. Grigsby
  Julia Elinor Schultz
  Muhamad Muqharabbin Mokhtarrudin
  Mike Gibbons
  Nikolaos Mangitsis
  Josu Feijoo
  James Holliday
  Joel Schauer
  Alexander Pancoe
  Leifur Svavarsson
   Khai Nguyen
  Taylor Sweitzer

See also 
 Grand Slam (golf)
 Grand Slam (tennis)
 Ocean Explorers Grand Slam

References

External links 
 
 
 Origins of the Explorers Grand Slam With Vanessa O'Brien

Seven Summits
Grand Slam
Competitions